The 2019–20 West Midlands (Regional) League season was the 120th in the history of the West Midlands (Regional) League (WMRL), a football competition in England which was formed in 1889. The league operates three divisions: the Premier Division, see below, at level 10 in the English football league system, Division One at level 11, and Division Two. The Premier Division is one of three divisions which feed into the Midland League Premier Division, the other two being the East Midlands Counties League and the Midland League's own Division One.

The allocations for Steps 1 to 6 for season 2019–20 were announced by the FA on 19 May. These were subject to appeal, and the West Midland (Regional) League's constitution was subject to ratification at the league's AGM on 3 June.

As a result of the COVID-19 pandemic, this season's competition was formally abandoned on 26 March 2020, with all results from the season being expunged, and no promotion or relegation taking place to, from, or within the competition. On 30 March 2020, sixty-six non-league clubs sent an open letter to the Football Association requesting that they reconsider their decision.

Premier Division

The Premier Division featured 14 clubs which competed in the division last season, along with four new clubs:
 Darlaston Town (1874), promoted from Division One
 Littleton, transferred from Midland League Division One
 Wolverhampton Sporting Community, relegated from Midland League Premier Division
 Worcester Raiders, promoted from Division One

League table

References

External links
 West Midlands (Regional) Football League

2019-20
10
Association football events curtailed and voided due to the COVID-19 pandemic